Jharkhand State Cricket Association is the governing body of the cricket activities in the Jharkhand state of India and the Jharkhand cricket team. It is affiliated to the Board of Control for Cricket in India.

History

It came in existence in year 2000 and got full membership of BCCI in 2003.

Association stands at a historic phase in its history, not only the former captain of the national side Mahendra Singh Dhoni is from Jharkhand but several other players have made their mark on the national stage in the past few years, three of them going on to play for the country.

In March 2011, for the first time in the history of the Association, the state team demolished Gujarat in the Finals to win the Vijay Hazare Trophy, a victory symbolic of the ascendancy of Jharkhand cricket.

A number of players had also gone on to perform valuable roles for their various franchises in the Indian Premier League. The construction of International Stadium at Ranchi had help the association to grow and helped more the player to play cricket. The construction began in the June 2009 and hosted its first first-class match in November, 2010.

Apart from a world-class stadium, the complex also has a second regulation, The Ranchi Oval, a fully equipped Indoor Cricket Facility, outdoor practice nets with ten wickets, state of the art synthetic tennis courts, a swimming pool, a clubhouse, etcetera.

Affiliated Districts
 Bokaro District Cricket Association
 Cricket Association of Saraikela-Kharswan
 Jamtara District Cricket Association
 Koderma District Cricket Association
 Chatra District Cricket Association
 Dhanbad Cricket Association
 Lohardaga District Cricket Association
 Latehar District Cricket Association
 District Cricket Association Dumka
 District Cricket Association Deoghar
 Palamu Cricket Association
 Pakur District Cricket Association
 District Cricket Association Sahibganj
 District Cricket Association Godda
 Ranchi District Cricket Association
 Ramgarh Cricket Association
 Garhwa District Cricket Association
 Giridih District Cricket Association
 Simdega District Cricket Association
 West Singhbhum District Cricket Association
 Gumla District Cricket Association
 Hazaribag District Cricket Association
 Khunti District Cricket Association

Home ground
 Keenan Stadium, Jamshedpur - Oldest venue in the state, has been hosted 10 ODIs
 JSCA International Cricket Stadium - Hosted 4 ODIs, IPL and Champions League T20 matches

Notable Players 

Following players of Jharkhand cricket team, who has represented India as of 7 October 2022 :
 Mahendra Singh Dhoni - former captain of Indian men's cricket team, led India in 2007 20-20 and 2011 ODI world cup victory.
 Saurabh Tiwary - played ODIs for Indian national cricket team
 Varun Aaron - a fast bowler, played Indian cricket team
 Shahbaz Nadeem -  a spinner played for Indian team

References

External links
Official JSCA website
JSCA page on BCCi website

See also
Jharkhand cricket team

Cricket administration in India
Cricket in Jharkhand
Sports organizations established in 2000
2000 establishments in Bihar